Albert Becker may refer to:

Albert Becker (chess player) (1896–1984), Austrian International Master
Albert Becker (composer) (1834–1899), German composer, conductor and academic
Albert L. Becker (1911–1992), American naval officer

See also
Albrecht Becker (1906–2002), German designer, photographer and actor
Becker (disambiguation)